Following is a list of all Article III United States federal judges appointed by President Theodore Roosevelt during his presidency. In total Roosevelt appointed 80 Article III federal judges, a record for his day surpassing the 46 appointed by Ulysses S. Grant. These included 3 Justices to the Supreme Court of the United States, 19 judges to the United States Courts of Appeals, and 58 judges to the United States district courts.

Five of Roosevelt's appointees - George Bethune Adams, Thomas H. Anderson, and Robert W. Archbald, Andrew McConnell January Cochran, and Benjamin Franklin Keller, were originally placed on their respective courts as recess appointments by President William McKinley. Following the assassination which resulted in McKinley's death on September 14, 1901, Roosevelt chose to formally nominate those judges for confirmation by the United States Senate, and all were confirmed.

Additionally, 9 Article I appointments are listed, including 5 judges to the United States Court of Claims and 4 members to the Board of General Appraisers (later the United States Customs Court).

From the establishment of the United States courts of appeals on June 16, 1891, until the abolition of the United States circuit courts on December 31, 1911, all United States Circuit Judges where jointly appointed to both the United States court of appeal and the United States circuit court for their respective circuit. Starting January 1, 1912, United States Circuit Judges served only on the United States court of appeal for their respective circuit.

United States Supreme Court justices

Courts of appeals and circuit courts
The United States circuit courts were abolished on January 1, 1912, the final day of service being December 31, 1911. The United States circuit court in the District of Columbia was abolished in 1863. Therefore, those individuals who served in the D.C. Circuit served only on the Court of Appeals and had no Circuit Court service.

District courts

Specialty courts (Article I)

United States Court of Claims

Board of General Appraisers

Notes

Renominations

References
General

 

Specific

Sources
 Federal Judicial Center

Presidency of Theodore Roosevelt
Roosevelt, Theodore